Cassia leptophylla is a tropical tree species in the genus Cassia, which is indigenous to Brazil. It is named gold medallion tree and has yellow flowers that bloom intermittently throughout the year, spawning seedpods that are rectangular in cross section and rattle festively. It is recognized by its thin green foliage with glossy green pinnate leaflets. The fruit is a long thin seedpod with four sides.

Native distribution
Cassia leptophylla is native to southeastern Brazil.

Uses
This tree does not have many uses, except as a decorative tree or as a laxative, something common to the genus Cassia.

Warning
Seeds are poisonous if ingested. Parts of the plant are poisonous if ingested.

Gallery

References

External links

Plants described in 1837
Endemic flora of Brazil
leptophylla